Wes Smith is a former wide receiver in the National Football League (NFL). Smith was drafted in the 1986 NFL Draft by the St. Louis Cardinals and was later a member of the Green Bay Packers. He played at the collegiate level at Texas A&M University-Commerce. (East Texas State University)

Smith gained All American Honors in Football as a receiver as well as Track & Field while at Texas A&M Commerce.  In Track &Field, Smith competed in the 100 meters, 400 meter hurdles, 4x100 relay and 4x400 relay.

Smith was voted to the Lone Star Conference All Decade team of the 1980s. held career and single season receiving records in career yards, career receptions, yards per reception, season receiving TD's and career receiving TD's.

See also
List of Green Bay Packers players

References
3.  http://lonestarconference.org/sports/2009/6/28/sports_fball_archive.aspx

4.  http://lonestarconference.org/sports/2009/6/28/sports_fball_archive.aspx

Green Bay Packers players
American football wide receivers
Texas A&M University–Commerce alumni
Texas A&M–Commerce Lions football players
Living people
Year of birth missing (living people)